5910 Amboy Road is a historic house located at Prince's Bay, Staten Island, New York. It was built about 1840 in the Greek Revival style. It is a frame house, sheathed with clapboard siding with a three bay central section flanked by two "stepped down" flanking wings. It features a central porch with four square paneled columns. It was added to the National Register of Historic Places on December 16, 1982.

See also
List of New York City Designated Landmarks in Staten Island
National Register of Historic Places listings in Richmond County, New York

References

Greek Revival architecture in New York City
Greek Revival houses in New York (state)
Houses completed in 1840
Houses on the National Register of Historic Places in Staten Island
New York City Designated Landmarks in Staten Island
Prince's Bay, Staten Island